Charles Duhigg (born 1974) is an American journalist and non-fiction author. He was a reporter for The New York Times, currently writes for The New Yorker Magazine and is the author of two books on habits and productivity, titled The Power of Habit: Why We Do What We Do in Life and Business and Smarter Faster Better. In 2013, Duhigg was the recipient of the Pulitzer Prize for Explanatory Reporting for a series of 10 articles on the business practices of Apple and other technology companies.

Early life and education
Charles Duhigg was born in 1974 in New Mexico. He graduated from Yale University and earned a Master of Business Administration from Harvard Business School.

Career
Duhigg is a former Los Angeles Times staff writer. Between 2006 and 2017, he was a reporter at The New York Times. He currently writes for The New Yorker Magazine and other publications.

Duhigg led a team of New York Times reporters who won the 2013 Pulitzer Prize for Explanatory Reporting for a series of 10 articles about the business practices of Apple and other technology companies. Duhigg wrote or co-wrote the series Toxic Waters, Golden Opportunities, and was part of the team that wrote The Reckoning.

Duhigg's book about the science of habit formation, titled The Power of Habit: Why We Do What We Do in Life and Business, was published by Random House on February 28, 2012. An extract was published in The New York Times entitled "How Companies Learn Your Secrets." The Power of Habit has spent over three years on The New York Timess bestseller lists.

He is also the author of Smarter Faster Better: The Secrets of Being Productive in Life and Business, which was released on March 8, 2016. It became a New York Times Best Seller on March 27, 2016.

Personal life
Duhigg resides in Santa Cruz, California. His sister, Katy Duhigg, is an attorney and politician who is a member of the New Mexico Senate.

Awards 
2007 George Polk Award
2007 Heywood Broun Award
2008 Hillman Prize
2008 Gerald Loeb Award Honorable Mention for Beat Writing for "Golden Opportunities"
2009 Scripps Howard National Journalism Award
2009 Investigative Reporters and Editors Medal
2009 Gerald Loeb Award for Large Newspapers for "The Reckoning"
2010 United States National Academies National Academies Communication Award,
2010 Society of Environmental Journalists Investigative Reporting Award
 awards from the Society of American Business Editors and Writers, the Deadline Awards, and the John B. Oakes Awards
2013, with other The New York Times reporters, Pulitzer Prize for Explanatory Reporting, for a series of 10 articles on the business practices of Apple and other technology companies.

Books
 The Power of Habit: Why We Do What We Do in Life and Business
 Smarter Faster Better: The Secrets of Being Productive in Life and Business

Articles
 "The Enablers: Venture capitalists used to exert discipline on startups. Now they often encourage recklessness", The New Yorker, 30 November 2020, pp. 38–47.

References

External links

Journalist's Twitter
Journalist's New York Times website
Journalist's website

1974 births
Living people
The New York Times writers
Los Angeles Times people
George Polk Award recipients
Yale University alumni
Harvard Business School alumni
Gerald Loeb Award winners for Large Newspapers
Gerald Loeb Award winners for Deadline and Beat Reporting
Pulitzer Prize for Explanatory Journalism winners
Writers from New Mexico